Jeff "Torch" McGee is a former professional Australian rules football player for South Melbourne and a current member of the Coodabeen Champions. McGee played seven games for South Melbourne in the 1966 and 1967 VFL seasons and scored a goal with his first league kick.

References

External links
 

Living people
1948 births
Sydney Swans players
Australian rules footballers from Victoria (Australia)
ABC radio (Australia) journalists and presenters
Radio personalities from Melbourne